I. Martin "Marty" Isaacs is a group theorist and representation theorist and professor emeritus of mathematics at the University of Wisconsin–Madison. He currently lives in Berkeley, California and is an occasional participant on MathOverflow.

Academic biography
Isaacs completed his Ph.D. from Harvard University in 1964 under Richard Brauer. From at least 1969 until 2011, he was a professor at the University of Wisconsin–Madison. In May 2011, he retired and became a professor emeritus. The Mathematics Genealogy Project lists him as having had 28 doctoral students.

Research
Isaacs is most famous for formulating the Isaacs–Navarro conjecture along with Gabriel Navarro, a widely cited generalization of the McKay conjecture.

Books
Isaacs is famous as the author of Character Theory of Finite Groups (first published in 1976), one of the most well-known graduate student-level introductory books in character theory and representation theory of finite groups.

Isaacs is also the author of the book Algebra: A Graduate Course (first published in 1994; republished in 2009), which received highly positive reviews. Additionally, he is the author of Finite Group Theory (published in 2008).

Honors
Isaacs is a professor emeritus at the University of Wisconsin–Madison. He retired in 2011.

In 2009, a conference was held at the Universitat de Valencia in Spain to honor his contributions.

Isaacs is also a Fellow of the American Mathematical Society.

Isaacs was a Pólya lecturer for the Mathematical Association of America. He received the Benjamin Smith Reynolds award for teaching engineering students at the University of Wisconsin and a UW Madison campus teaching award. He was also the recipient of a Sloan Foundation research award.

References

20th-century American mathematicians
21st-century American mathematicians
Living people
Group theorists
Harvard University alumni
University of Wisconsin–Madison faculty
Writers from Wisconsin
Fellows of the American Mathematical Society
Year of birth missing (living people)